Organic structure  may refer to:

 Organic (model), forms, methods and patterns found in living systems, often used as a metaphor for non-living things
 The molecular structure of an organic compound, also known as the structural formula of an organic compound

See also
Organic (disambiguation)